Chodecz  is a small town in Włocławek County in the Kuyavian-Pomeranian Voivodeship of Poland. It is situated in Central Poland, midway between Lubień Kujawski and Przedecz. The southwest side of Chodecz borders on Lake Chodeckie. During the Nazi occupation, the city was named Godetz. As of December 2021, the town has a population of 2,244.

Demographics

Detailed data as of 31 December 2021:

Number of inhabitants by year

Landmarks
 parish church; Dominic from 1849 to 1850, Gothic
 cemetery complex of buildings, which includes: Chapel St. James from 1799, late Baroque, columbarium and the house brothers hospital

References

Cities and towns in Kuyavian-Pomeranian Voivodeship
Włocławek County
Pomeranian Voivodeship (1919–1939)